The Center for Student Missions (CSM) is a Christian mission organization.

History 
CSM began in 1988. Instead of traveling to a different country and creating their own ministry, groups are brought into urban centers throughout North America and partnered with ministries in the city.

References

External links 
 
  Students Spend Spring Break Helping Others, Click2Houston.com, March 22, 2006
  "Mission Organizer Advises Sensitivity to Needs of Poor", Pittsburgh Post-Gazette, October 16, 2005

Christian missions in North America